The Utah Wing of the Civil Air Patrol (CAP) is the highest level of Civil Air Patrol in the state of Utah. Its headquarters is located in Salt Lake City, Utah. As of 2014, Utah Wing consists of over 750 cadet and adult members in 14 locations across the state of Utah.

Mission 
The Utah Wing has six primary missions of the Civil Air Patrol for both Civil Air Patrol members and the general public: Emergency Services, Cadet Programs, and Aerospace Education.

Counter-drug 
CAP joined the War on Drugs in 1986 when, according to congressional authorization, it signed an agreement with the U.S. Air Force and U.S. Customs Service allowing CAP resources to help stem the flow of drugs into and throughout the United States.

Cadet programs
Thousands of young people are introduced to aviation through CAP's cadet program. The program allows young people to progress through a 16-step program including aerospace, education, leadership training, physical fitness, and moral leadership. Cadets compete for academic scholarships to further their studies in fields such as engineering, science, aircraft mechanics, aerospace medicine, meteorology, as well as many others. Cadets who earn cadet officer status may enter the Air Force as an E3 (airman first class) rather than an E1 (airman basic).

In support of cadet training, the Utah Wing conducts a cadet basic encampment semiannually. Encampment is the initial special cadet activity that serves as a gateway for further progress in the training program. Instruction topics include the history and customs of the U.S. Air Force,  core values, and career exploration in aviation and STEM careers. The 2020 summer encampment series was named Desert Hawk XVIII and the encampment has been held at Wendover Airfield, Utah, for over a decade. The winter encampment series in 2019 was known as Southern Arch III and was held in Mesquite, Nevada, from December 26-31, 2019. 

Each year, cadets have the opportunity to participate in special activities at the local, state, regional, or national level. Many cadets have the opportunity to solo fly in an airplane for the first time through a flight camping or academy, while others travel abroad through the International Air Cadet Exchange Program. Cadets also assist at major air shows throughout the United States.

Aerospace education
CAP's aerospace education efforts focus on two different audiences: volunteer CAP members and the general public. The programs ensure that all CAP members (seniors and cadets) have an appreciation for and knowledge of aerospace issues. Members are required to participate in the educational program to advance within the organization. Materials are provided by aerospace educators at CAP's National Headquarters at Maxwell Air Force Base in Montgomery, Alabama, United States 

In addition to internal aerospace education, the CAP's external aerospace programs are conducted through the national educational system. The CAP sponsors numerous workshops every year in states all throughout the country, reaching hundreds of teachers and consequently thousands of students. These workshops highlight basic aerospace knowledge and focus on advances in aerospace technology. CAP's aerospace education members receive more than 20 free aerospace education classroom materials.

The internal aerospace education program is divided into cadet and senior programs. Cadets complete aerospace education as one of the requirements to progress through the achievement levels of the cadet program, while Senior members have a responsibility to become knowledgeable of aerospace issues and the aerospace education program that CAP provides. They are further encouraged to share the information obtained with their local communities and school systems.

Organization

See also
Awards and decorations of the Civil Air Patrol
Utah Air National Guard
Utah State Defense Force

References

External links
Utah Wing Civil Air Patrol official website

Wings of the Civil Air Patrol
Education in Utah
Military in Utah